Karera is a municipality or Nagar Parishad in the Shivpuri district of the Indian state of Madhya Pradesh.

Geography
Karera is the second-largest city in the Shivpuri district after Shivpuri itself. It has an average elevation of 305 meters (1000 feet) and covers approximately 41.8 km.

Demographics
Males constitute 55% of the population, while females constitute 45%. Sixteen percent of the population is under 6 years of age. Karera has an average literacy rate of 78%, higher than the national average of 59.5%. Male literacy is 83% and female literacy is 64%.

Tourist attractions

There are six Jain Temples.

Other attractions include:
 Karera Fort
 Amola Wali Dukkaiyya 
 Foota Taal
 River
 MP's longest river bridge Amola approximately 2 km
 Samoha Dam
 Siddhan
 "Nursery" Filter Road
 Machhawali
 Chaturbhuj Temple (Ancient temple)
 Machhawali Mata Temple

Karera Wildlife Sanctuary

The Karera Wildlife Sanctuary was established in 1981, and spans an area of 202 km2. The sanctuary is managed by the field director of Madhav National Park in Shivpuri district.

Communication services
Karera is covered by an extensive fiber optic network. The Karera fixed telephone line operator in the city is BSNL. There are eight mobile phone companies in Karera, which include BSNL, Vodafone 4G, Idea 4G, Airtel 4G, Jio 4G, Tata DoCoMo 3G,  CDMA services are offered by BSNL 3G. Internet broadband and IPTV services are provided by BSNL. The city is also connected to Digital TV.

Transport

Roads
Karera is connected with neighboring cities and other major cities of India by road (NH-25) Shivpuri, (NH-27) Jhansi, Sagar, Datia, Dabra,  Lucknow, Indore, Bhopal, Guna, Gwalior, Kota, Orai, Kanpur, Allahabad, Ajmer, Jaipur, Udaipur, Ahmedabad.

Daily buses services operate within the city, with inter-city services also available daily to many cities in Madhya Pradesh, Uttar Pradesh and Rajasthan.

Railway
Karera is not directly accessible by rail, with the nearest railway stations located in Jhansi 45 km to the east and Shivpuri 55 km west of the city.

Airways
The nearest major airport is located at Gwalior which operates flights to Delhi, Bhopal, Indore, Mumbai, Pune, Ahmedabad, Jabalpur, Jaipur, and most large cities in India.

Education

Schools
 Ghoore walo School
 Govt. H.S. School Machhawali
 Ideal Cambridge School
 Kendriya Vidyalaya ITBP. Karera (CBSE)
 New Happiness Public School, Karera
 Patel Higher Secondary School Karera
 Sanskriti Public School (CBSE)
 Saraswati Shishu Vidhya Mandir
 Shakuntalam Public School Karera
 Shri Ganesh Bal Mandir Primary Middle School Karera (SGBM Karera)
 Sita Central Convent School
 St. John's School, Karera
 Swami Vivekanand School
 Tirupati Blessed Higher Secondary School

Universities and Colleges
 EMPI Institute
 Gayatri Educational College
 Govt. College of Science & Art, Karera
 ITI Collage Karera
 MK Academy Karera
 PK University

References

Shivpuri
Cities and towns in Shivpuri district